This list only includes federal officials convicted of certain select corruption crimes.
For a more complete list see:  List of American federal politicians convicted of crimes and List of federal political scandals in the United States.

Dozens of high-level United States federal officials have been convicted of public corruption offenses for conduct while in office. These officials have been convicted under two types of statutes. The first type are also applicable to corrupt state and local officials: the mail and wire fraud statutes (enacted 1872), including the honest services fraud provision, the Hobbs Act (enacted 1934), the Travel Act (enacted 1961), and the Racketeer Influenced and Corrupt Organizations Act (RICO) (enacted 1970). In addition, federal officials are subject to the federal bribery, graft, and conflict-of-interest crimes contained in Title 18, Chapter 11 of the United States Code, 18 U.S.C. §§ 201–227, which do not apply to state and local officials. Most notably, § 201(b) prohibits the receipt of bribes, and § 201(c) prohibits the receipt of unlawful gratuities, by federal public officials. Lesser used statutes include conspiracy to defraud the United States (enacted 1867) and the Foreign Corrupt Practices Act (FCPA) (enacted 1977).

Where the defendant is a member of the United States Congress, the Speech or Debate Clause of Article One of the United States Constitution—providing that: "[F]or any Speech or Debate in either House, [Senators or Representatives] shall not be questioned in any other Place"—limits the acts which may be charged and the evidence that may be introduced.

Inclusion criteria and organization
Only high-level federal officials are included in this list. For the executive branch, this means the President, Vice President, and Cabinet members (i.e. officials compensated at Level I of the Executive Schedule). For the legislative branch, this means members of the Congress, whether the Senate or House of Representatives. For the judicial branch, this means Article Three judges. Lower-level officials are not included on this list, although they may be prosecuted for the same offenses.

Acquitted officials are not listed (if an official was acquitted on some counts, and convicted on others, the counts of conviction are listed). If a defendant is convicted of a conspiracy to commit a corruption offense, the substantive offense is listed. Convictions such as making false statements, perjury, obstruction of justice, electoral fraud, violations of campaign finance regulations, tax evasion and money laundering are not included in this list. Censure, impeachment, and removal from office are also not included in this list.

The list is organized by office. The criminal statute(s) under which the conviction(s) were obtained are noted, as are the names of notable investigations, scandals, or litigation, if applicable. The year of conviction is included (if the official was convicted multiple times due to retrials, only the year of the first conviction is included). Certain details, including post-conviction relief, if applicable, are included in footnotes. Political affiliation is also included.

List

See also
Ulysses S. Grant presidential administration scandals
List of federal political scandals in the United States

References

Federal officials convicted of corruption offenses

Lists of criminals